The Molyobka is a river in Perm Krai, Russia, a right tributary of the Asovka. Its origin is located east of the village of Malyshi, and its mouth is upstream of the settlement of Asovo.

References 

Rivers of Perm Krai